Uğurcan Karagöz (born September 20, 1995) is a Turkish curler.

Teams

Men's

Mixed

Mixed doubles

References

External links

Living people
1995 births
Turkish male curlers
Place of birth missing (living people)
21st-century Turkish people